Ghoriwala also called Ghariwola  is a town and union council in Bannu District of Khyber-Pakhtunkhwa. It is located at 32°54'20N 70°43'40E and has an altitude of 295 meters (968 feet). Its history and name is sometimes linked with the famous Muslim King Sultan Muhammad Ghori. The area is mostly inhabited by Mughal Khel branch of Yousafzai Pashtuns.

History

First Settlement 

Ghoriwala is known for its historical significance as it is believed to be the location where the Ghurid ruler Muhammad of Ghor set up camp during his invasions of India. The town's name "Ghoriwala" means "place of Ghori". Local legend states that Sultan Ghori dug a well during his stay in the area, and that the Mangal and Hani tribes also accompanied him and settled in the vicinity. Although, many of the historical information and legends could be inaccurate and subject to verification, the Ghorid Empire did leave significant impact on the subcontinent.

Arrival of Mughal Khel 

The Mughal Khel of Ghoriwala is a tribe of Yusufzai origin who settled in the area in 17th century  during the decline of the Mughal Empire. They were able to establish themselves in the area through their military prowess and strategic alliances with other groups. Despite the passage of time, the Mughal Khel have managed to preserve their identity, culture, and customs. They are a prime example of how different bands of adventurers were able to establish themselves in unoccupied lands during the disruption and decay of the Mughal Empire.

Geography

Climate
Ghoriwala falls under the Köppen climate classification of hot desert climate (BWh). This type of climate is characterized by very hot temperatures throughout the year and low amounts of precipitation. There is little variation in temperature between seasons, and there may be occasional dust storms due to the dry conditions. In this region, temperatures can reach over 40°C (104°F) during the summer months, while precipitation is typically less than 100mm per year.

Bani Gul City
In a recent development, the provincial government of KP has approved plans to establish a new city in the Ghoriwala between Bannu and Lakki Marwat districts. The project was approved in response to the growing residential and other problems faced by over 1.6 million residents of Bannu. The new city will be built on 10,000 kanals of land in Ghoriwala, near the China-Pakistan Economic Corridor (CPEC) route and the approved Peshawar–Dera Ismail Khan motorway.

The construction of Banni Gul City is expected to bring significant changes to the region of Ghoriwala. The project will provide new job opportunities and economic growth for the local population as it will require a workforce for the construction and maintenance of the city. The presence of a new city in the area is also expected to attract businesses and investments, leading to further economic development.

The new city will also provide much-needed housing and other facilities such as healthcare, education, sports and recreation, and uninterrupted power and gas supply to the residents. It will improve the overall standard of living in the region and help to alleviate the housing and other problems faced by the residents of Bannu.

In addition, the location of Banni Gul City, near the China-Pakistan Economic Corridor (CPEC) route and the motorway, makes it a strategic location for trade and transportation. This can open up new opportunities for trade and tourism in the region. The Urban Areas Development Authority has been tasked with executing the project

Major Tribes 
Following are the Major Tribes settled in Ghoriwala:

Notable People
Syed Naseeb Ali Shah, Former Member of the National Assembly of Pakistan
Abdur Rashid, Former Field Hockey Player
Brig. Abdul Hamid, Former Field Hockey Player and Ex Secretary General Pakistan Hockey Federation
Jafar Khan Yousafzai, Former Tribal Elder and Raes of Ghoriwala, Nar Jaffar Khan, Ismail Khel and Hassan Khel Jafar Khan Tappa

See Also
 Bannu
 Yousafzai
 Sultan Muhammad Ghori
 Gadezai, Buner
 Peshawar-Dera Ismail Khan Motorway
 Union Councils of District Bannu

References

Union councils of Bannu District
Populated places in Bannu District